Jelly Boy is a platform game developed by Probe Software for the Super Nintendo Entertainment System and Game Boy. It was published in Europe in 1995 by Ocean Software.

Gameplay
Jelly Boy puts the player in the control of a jelly baby with morphing powers. His quest is to find various items inside a factory so that the elevator doorman will allow him to meet the person in charge. The most important items are musical notes, which serve both as an extra life (at 100 notes) as well as a one-hit shield (after a collision, the notes are lost, and further collisions result in death).

Release
The game was planned for release on October 1994 on the Super Nintendo, but was delayed. A Sega Genesis version was cancelled. In July 2021, Jelly Boy was added to the Nintendo Switch Online classic games service.

Reception

In 1995, Total! ranked Jelly Boy 73rd on their Top 100 SNES Games writing: "On the surface this platformer seems basic but the challenge is big and it’s strangely gripping."

References

External links

Jelly Boy at Giant Bomb
Magazine review  
Instruction manual 

1995 video games
Europe-exclusive video games
Platform games
Game Boy games
Super Nintendo Entertainment System games
Ocean Software games
Cancelled Sega Genesis games
Nintendo Switch Online games
Video games developed in the United Kingdom